Greenbrier County Schools is the operating school district within Greenbrier County, West Virginia. It is governed by the Greenbrier County Board of Education.

Board of Education

The elected Greenbrier Board of Education is made up of the following members:
Jeanie Wyatt, President
Mary Humphreys
Richard Parker
Paula Sanford-Dunford
Andrew Utterback

Schools

High schools
Greenbrier East High School 
Greenbrier West High School

Middle schools (Formerly Junior High Schools)
Eastern Greenbrier Middle School (Formerly Eastern Greenbrier Junior High) 
Western Greenbrier Middle School (Formerly Western Greenbrier Junior High)

Elementary schools
Alderson Elementary School 
Crichton Elementary School 
Frankford Elementary School 
Lewisburg Elementary School 
Rainelle Elementary School 
Ronceverte Elementary School 
Rupert Elementary School 
Smoot Elementary School 
White Sulphur Springs Elementary School

Former Schools
 Alderson High/Junior High School
 Alvon/Neola School (Near White Sulphur Springs)
 Boling School (Caldwell)
 Charmco School
 Crichton High/Junior High (Quinwood)
 Crawley School
 East Rainelle School
 Frankford High/Junior High School
 Greenbrier High/Junior School (Ronceverte)
 Lewisburg Intermediate School
 Lewisburg Elementary/Junior High School 
 Rainelle High/Junior High School
 Renick High/Junior High School
 Renick Elementary School
 Rupert High/Junior High School
 Smoot High/Junior High School
 White Sulphur Springs High/Junior High School (Now Greenbrier Episcopal School) 
 Williamsburg High/Junior High School
 Williamsburg Elementary School

Other
Alternative/Home Schooling (County-wide)
Greenbrier Nursing School (Located at Greenbrier East High School)

References

External links

Official Website

School districts in West Virginia
Education in Greenbrier County, West Virginia